James W. Maloney (April 1, 1909 – March 10, 1984) was an American Hall of Fame trainer of Thoroughbred racehorses. The son of a trainer, his own professional career lasted fifty years from 1935 until his death in 1984.

Jim Maloney trained for such prominent owners as Charles W. Engelhard, Jr.'s Cragwood Stables, Harry and Jane Lunger's Christiana Stables, Hope Hanes, wife of the president of the New York Racing Association, and for William Haggin Perry with whom he enjoyed some of his greatest successes. Although Maloney's career was interrupted by service with the United States military during World War II, in all he trained forty-two stakes race winners including two Champions: Lamb Chop in 1963 and Hall of Fame inductee Gamely in 1968.

Jim Maloney died at age 74 on March 10, 1984, at the Mayo Clinic in Rochester, Minnesota.

References

1909 births
1984 deaths
American military personnel of World War II
American horse trainers
United States Thoroughbred Racing Hall of Fame inductees